Mittraphap Road or Highway 2 is one of the four primary highways in Thailand, along with Phahonyothin Road (Highway 1), Sukhumvit Road (Highway 3), and Phetkasem Road (Highway 4). It runs from Saraburi to Nong Khai. 

The road was originally built from Khorat to Nong Khai by the United States in 1955–1957 at a cost of US$20 million to supply its northeastern military bases.

It is the first highway in Thailand to meet international standards, and the first highway in Thailand to use both asphalt and concrete. It received the name "Thanon Mittraphap" on 20 February 1957. The name literally means "Friendship Road". It is the main road that connects Isan (northeastern Thailand) across the Dong Phaya Yen Range. The highway begins at Saraburi, Phahonyothin Road (Highway 1) junction. It passes through the provinces of Nakhon Ratchasima, Khon Kaen, Udon Thani, and ends in Nong Khai, where it links with the Thai-Lao Friendship Bridge to Laos.

References

National highways in Thailand
Nakhon Ratchasima province